

The governor of the North Western Province of Sri Lanka ( Wayamba palāth āndukāravarayā) is responsible for the management of the North Western Provincial Council. Some of the office's key functions include exercising powers vested in the governor by the Provincial Council Act No. 42 of 1987 amended by Act No. 28 of 1990 and the 13th Amendment to the Constitution.

Governors

See also
 List of Chief Ministers of Sri Lanka

References

External links
Office of the Governor
North Western Provincial Council

North Western